Canadian stepdance, also known as Maritimes stepdance, is a style of stepdance in Canada, stemming from European origins including France, Scotland and Ireland. Canadian stepdancing involves fast dancing to fiddle music using shoes with taps designed to accentuate the dancer's rhythmical, drumming foot movements. Dancers generally require little dance space to perform their routines. Some styles of Canadian stepdancing include upper-body postures that are relatively relaxed compared with older stepdance styles, allowing occasional arm movements that flow with the rhythm of the dance, or hands on hips.

Traditional stepdance styles
There are several different stepdances, which are named after the musical tempos that they are danced to. A reel, the most popular step dance, is played in 4/4 time, and is fun, fast and lively. A jig, also quite popular, is played in 6/8 time and sounds like an energetic march. The clog is slower, danced at 1/2 time, and is considered to be a more graceful dance. Other stepdances include the hornpipe, strathspey, two-step, and polka.

Canadian stepdance by region
There are three different Canadian stepdance styles originating from different regions across Canada. Cape Breton Stepdance is unique to the Cape Breton Island region of Nova Scotia, brought there by the Scottish settlers fleeing the Highland Clearances in an effort to preserve their traditional Highlands culture. It is danced with straight arms, stiff upper bodies, and quick, repetitive footwork. French Canadian or Quebecois Stepdance originates from the lumber camps and villages of Quebec, taking influence from Irish and Breton dance, and involves intricate footwork with arms relaxed but mostly immobile. Ottawa Valley Stepdance, a uniquely Canadian stepdance style, deriving from the Ottawa Valley, features variable, aggressive steps danced high off the floor, and flowing arm movements. Ottawa Valley Style originated in the lumber camps, as a way of leisure after the day's hard work. Curiously, it has incorporated tap dance elements.

See also 

 Jig

References

Canadian dances
Culture of the Maritimes
Body percussion